Zeinab Suma Jammeh (born ) is the former First Lady of the Gambia and the main wife of the former President of the Gambia, Yahya Jammeh. In September 2019, the results of the Janneh Commission, a committee of inquiry set up by the Barrow government to investigate Jammeh's financial activities, were published. The report indicated that she has appropriated public funds from the Gambia amounting to 3.3 million Dalasi and 2 million US dollars through her foundation.

Early life
Zeinab Suma (or Soumah) was born to Alhaji Ibrahima and Rhimou El Hassady Soumah in Morocco.

References

Living people
1977 births
First ladies of the Gambia
Gambian people of Guinean descent
Moroccan emigrants to the Gambia
People from Rabat